Danilo Augusto Chapoval de Azevedo (born 21 February 1994) is a Brazilian professional Footballer who plays as a defender. He plays for and  captains Bangladeshi club Fortis FC in Bangladesh Premier League.

Club career
Born in Brazil, Danilo joined the squad of Série A side Náutico, in the 2014 season. However, he didn't play any matches for the side. On 31 August 2019, he joined Minerva Punjab on a free deal from Central.

On 4 November 2021, Danilo joined Bangladesh Premier League club Bangladesh Police FC, he was integral for the club during his lone year and was also made the clubs captain. Danilo remained in Bangladesh the following season by joining newly promoted corporate club Fortis FC, On 4 August 2022.

References

1992 births
Living people
Brazilian footballers
Association football defenders
Campeonato Brasileiro Série A players
Vera Cruz Futebol Clube players
Belo Jardim Futebol Clube players
Serra Talhada Futebol Clube players
Central Sport Club players
Birkirkara F.C. players
RoundGlass Punjab FC players
Brazilian expatriate footballers
Brazilian expatriate sportspeople in India
Brazilian expatriate sportspeople in Bangladesh
Bangladesh Football Premier League players
Bangladesh Police FC players
Expatriate footballers in India
Sportspeople from Roraima